The Roundup is a 2022 South Korean crime action film directed by Lee Sang-yong, starring Ma Dong-seok, Son Suk-ku, and Choi Gwi-hwa. A sequel of 2017 film The Outlaws and is the second installment of Crime City series. The film was released theatrically on May 18, 2022 in IMAX format. Set after 4 years from the previous film, Detective Ma Seok-do travels to Vietnam to extradite a suspect, but comes across some  gruesome murders of Korean tourists by a vicious killer named Kang Hae-sung. 

On accounting its box office performance, the film opened at number 1 at the South Korean box office and mobilized 467,525 admissions, which is the best opening for a Korean film in the last 882 days. It became first film in South Korea to register 10 million admissions in 2022 on 25th day. It is the 4th film starring Ma Dong-seok to break through the $10 million mark, and the 20th Korean film in history to achieve the feat. After being released in five countries, the film is currently ranked fifth in the global box office as of June 12. 

The film became the highest performing South Korean release since COVID-19 pandemic. Currently it is the top-grossing film of 2022 in South Korea, with gross of US$100.06 million and 12.59 million admissions, and also figures in the List of highest-grossing films in South Korea at 3rd place on the Domestic films by gross and at 9th place on the Domestic films by admissions as per the Korean Film Council.

Plot
Four years after the sweeping operation in Garibong-dong, Detective Ma Seok-do and Captain Jeon Il-man head to Ho Chi Minh City, Vietnam to extradite a suspect Yoo Jong-hoon. After their arrival, they meet some Koreans living in Vietnam. Ma interrogates Jong-hoon, who reveals that he turned himself in because Lee Jong-du tried to kill him. Ma and Il-man leave for Jong-du's hideout, only to find him dead, where they learn about the duo's involvement with Kang Hae-sang, a vicious killer who has kidnapped and killed Koreans and several tourists, in exchange for money. Kang's one such victim is a wealthy young Korean named Choi Yong-gi. 

Ma, Il-man and Park Chang-su (the resident officer at the consulate) digs the garden, where they find Choi's body, but the local police warn him to halt the investigation. Despite the proceedings, Ma and Il-man arrives at a gambling den, where they interrogate a Korean thug named Raku, and learn that Choi's father Choi Choon-baek, a business mogul have send mercenaries to kill Kang. Later, Kang arrives at the house, where he kills all the hired killers, who reveal about Choon-baek. Ma arrives and overpowers Kang, but the latter escapes. Ma and Il-man are deported back to Korea, where they learn that Kang has smuggled himself and landed in the city to meet Choon-baek. After the duo land in Korea, Ma interrogates Jang I-soo, who is alive and now running an export service, where he learns about a recently arrived smuggling boat. 

They check the CCTV footage of Gongping port, only to confirm that Kang has arrived. Choon-baek announces a hefty amount for his men to bring Kang alive. After learning that Kang's case have been handed over to the Foreign Affairs, Ma and Il-man convince their superiors and receive a week deadline to catch him. Kang discreetly arrives at Choi's funeral, where he kidnaps Choon-baek, after killing his bodyguard. Kang then contacts Choon-baek's wife Kim In-sook and demands money, in exchange for Choon-baek. In-sook takes help from Ma and his team and cooperates with them, so that they can arrest Kang. Ma takes the help of Jang I-soo, who along with In-sook heads to the location where the deal is taking place in disguise as her driver. 

Meanwhile, Ma's teammate Dong-gyun finds Kang's hideout where he rescues Choon-baek and requests backup, but is stabbed by Kang, who escapes after seeing the backup cops. After driving at the parking lot of a shopping complex, Jang I-soo escapes with the money, leaving In-sook behind while Ma and his teammates subdue Kang's two associates. With the plans of extortion gone awry, Kang decides to escape from Korea with the money that Jang I-soo took. He tracks Jang I-soo's acquaintance "Captain Eye" and learns that Jang I-soo is planning to escape to China. Kang confronts Jang I-soo, who escapes leaving the money behind. Afterwards, Kang boards a bus to leave Korea. From a tip-off by Jang I-soo, Ma stops the bus where he defeats Kang and has him arrested. In the aftermath, Ma and his team celebrate for solving the case.

Inspiration

The storyline is loosely based on the story of Yoon Cheol-wan, a missing South Korean soldier who was a suspected victim of a serial kidnapping and murder case that took place in the Philippines between 2008 and 2012, in which several other Koreans who disappeared were among the victims of the case. Unlike the film in which the perpetrators are punished, the real incident has not been solved completely due to the unconfirmed number of victims and the uncertainty of Yoon's final fate. The real-life perpetrators of the case were all sentenced to life imprisonment for only a few out of all the killings they committed.

Cast 
 Ma Dong-seok as Ma Seok-do
 A detective, deputy leader of the Major Crimes Unit at Geumcheon Police Station.
 Son Suk-ku as Kang Hae-sang
 A vicious criminal who has been kidnapping and murdering Koreans in Vietnam.
 Choi Gwi-hwa as Jeon Il-man
 Leader of the Major Crimes Unit at Geumcheon Police Station.
 Park Ji-hwan as Jang I-soo
 A tour agent and former gangster.
 Heo Dong-won as Oh Dong-gyun
 A senior detective of the Major Crimes Unit at Geumcheon Police Station.
 Ha Jun as Kang Hong-seok
 A detective of the Geumcheon Police Station Major Crimes Unit.
 Jung Jae-kwang as Kim Sang-hoon
 The youngest detective of the Geumcheon Police Station Major Crimes Unit.
 Nam Moon-chul as Choi Choon-baek
 Choi Yong-gi's father and a business tycoon.
 Park Ji-young as Kim In-sook 
 Choi Yong-gi's mother and Choi Choon-baek's wife.
 Lee Joo-won as Park Young-sa
 Consulate General of South Korea in Ho Chi Minh City.
 Eum Moon-suk as Jang Ki-cheol
 Kang Hae-sang's subordinate, Jang Soon-cheol's brother. 
 Kim Chan-hyung as Jang Soon-cheol
 Kang Hae-sang's subordinate, Jang Ki-cheol's brother.
 Lee Kyu-won as Doo-ik
 Kang Hae-sang's subordinate.
 Cha Woo-jin as Choi Yong-gi
 Choi Choon-baek's son who was kidnapped and murdered by Kang Hae-sang.
 Jeon Jin-oh as Yoo Jong-hoon
 A self-surrendered criminal who is the reason why Ma and Jeon initially goes to Vietnam.
 Jung In-gi as Chief of Geumcheon Police Station

Production 
The film was scheduled to be filmed in Vietnam in March 2020, but due to COVID-19 pandemic, filming schedule in Vietnam was postponed and the domestic part was filmed first. Later, it was decided to complete the post-production in Korea by mobilizing local filming, sets, and CG. Filming concluded in June 2021. The net production cost of the film was about 10.5 billion won. Including marketing and promotional costs, the total production cost was about 13 billion won.

Release
The Roundup was pre-sold to 132 countries around the world ahead of its release in South Korea. North America, Taiwan, Mongolia, Hong Kong, Singapore, and the Philippines were preparing for the simultaneous release with Korea. It was released on 2,521 screens on May 18, 2022 in South Korea. The film was released in Philippines on June 22, 2022 by Raon Company Plus. 

The film was banned from screening in Vietnam by censorship authorities on the grounds that "there are too many violent scenes" while some speculated that it might be because of the negative portrayal of Vietnamese Ho Chi Minh City in the movie.

Reception

Box office
The Roundup opened with a record 467,525 admissions, which is the highest opening for a film released in South Korea in the last 882 days since Ashfall. It is also the best opening for a Korean film in 2022 so far and post-pandemic era. The film crossed 1 million cumulative admissions in 2 days of release, by recording 1,016,695 cumulative viewers. It surpassed 1.5 million viewers on 3rd day of its release, and 2 million on 4th day, thereby becoming the fastest film to achieve the record since 2020 film Deliver Us from Evil, which achieved the feat in first weekend. It crossed 3 million viewers on 5th day of release, this is achieved in the shortest time among Korean films since Parasite (2019). Then it went on to cross 5 million cumulative audiences in 10 days, which is fastest in last 882 days since Ashfall, which also registered 5 million on the 10th day of its release on December 28, 2019. Continuing its success it registered 10 million viewers on 25th day, thereby becoming the first film of the year 2022 and first Korean film since Parasite (2019) to garner 10 million admissions. It surpassed 11 million viewers in 31 days, and then surpassed 11,565,479 theatregoers of Train to Busan on the 35th day of its release by gathering 11,572,603 audiences. It created another record by surpassing 12 million viewers in 40 days and was placed 9th in the List of highest-grossing domestic films by admissions.

 it is the top-grossing film of the year 2022 in South Korea, with gross of US$100,064,909 and 12,592,880 admissions. And, as per Box Office Mojo it ranks 21 at 2022 Worldwide Box Office.

Critical response
The review aggregator website Rotten Tomatoes reported a 94% approval rating based on 16 reviews, with an average rating of 7.9/10.

James Marsh of South China Morning Post gave 4 stars out of 5, and praised Ma Dong-seok's performance as "a truly unique, utterly captivating leading man." Baek Geon-woo in his review for Oh My News praised the performance of Ma Dong-seok and described his character as "the Korean version of the 'superhero' shown in the West." Xports' Kim Ye-eun appreciated the direction of the action scenes presented by the main character Ma Seok-do and the villain Kang Hae-sang. Whang Yee Ling of The Straits Times rated the film 3 out of 5 and wrote, "Lee and his returning teammates share slapstick camaraderie, and their investigation maintains rambunctious energy to climax in a thrilling extended car chase." Dennis Harvey writing for Variety appreciated the direction of Lee Sang-yong and praised the comic elements of the film, stating "the movie manages with deceptive ease, maximizing both humor and extreme harm."

Criticism
Several organizations dedicated to the rights of disabled people criticized the film for fueling prejudices by depicting a character with a mental disability as a danger to the public: a scene in the beginning of the film where a man escaped from a mental hospital, threatens the police and public with a knife as he holds two women hostage inside a supermarket. On 7 July 2022, group of seven organizations, including the Korea Association for Mental Disorders and the Research Institute of the Differently Abled Person's Rights in Korea, held a press event in front of the National Human Rights Commission of Korea building in Seoul, calling on authorities to ban screenings of the film. Responding to the matter, the production crew stated that they had no intention of giving off that sort of message.

Accolades

Sequel 

A sequel under title The Roundup: No Way Out, directed by Lee Sang-yong and produced by Big Punch Pictures, Hong film and B.A. Entertainment, with the cast of Ma Dong-seok, Lee Jun-hyuk, Aoki Munetaka, Lee Beom-soo, Kim Min-jae, Jeon Seok-ho, and Ko Kyu-pil began filming on July 20, 2022. The plot follows Detective Ma Seok-do, who changes his affiliation from the Geumcheon Police Station to the Metropolitan Investigation Team to eradicate Japanese gangsters who crosses over to Korea and causing heinous crimes. It is scheduled to be released in 2023.

References

External links
 
 
 
 
 

2022 films
2020s South Korean films
2020s Korean-language films
2022 crime action films
South Korean crime action films
South Korean gangster films
South Korean police films
South Korean sequel films
Films about kidnapping
Films set in Gyeonggi Province
Films set in Ho Chi Minh City
Films set in Incheon
Films set in Seoul
Films set in 2008
Films shot in Gyeonggi Province
Films shot in Gwangju
Films shot in Incheon
Films shot in Seoul
IMAX films
Film controversies in Vietnam
South Korean films based on actual events